Tychius stephensi, the red clover seed weevil, is a species of leguminous seed weevil in the family of beetles known as Curculionidae.

References

Further reading

External links

 

Curculioninae
Beetles described in 1932